Georgios Athanasiadis (born 16 December 1963) is a Greek former professional footballer who played as a midfielder.

References

1963 births
Living people
Egaleo F.C. players
Apollon Smyrnis F.C. players
OFI Crete F.C. players
Panathinaikos F.C. players
Xanthi F.C. players
Kavala F.C. players
Ethnikos Piraeus F.C. players
Association football midfielders
Super League Greece players
Greece international footballers
Footballers from Athens
Greek footballers